Centromere protein F is a protein that in humans is encoded by the CENPF gene. It is involved in chromosome segregation during cell division. It also has a role in the orientation of microtubules to form cellular cilia.

Function 
CENPF is part of the nuclear matrix during the G2 phase of the cell cycle (the phase of rapid protein synthesis in preparation for mitosis). In late G2, the protein forms part of the kinetochore, a disc-shaped protein complex that allows the centromere of two sister chromatids to attach to microtubules (forming the spindle apparatus) in order for the microtubules to pull them apart in the process of dividing the cell. It remains part of the kinetochore through early anaphase (the chromosome-dividing phase). In late anaphase, CENPF localises to the spindle midzone, and in telophase (the cell-dividing phase) it localises to the intercellular bridge. It is thought to be subsequently degraded. Mutations in CENPF lead to impaired cell division during early development. Mitosis has been found to take longer when the gene is mutated.

Microtubules are protein structures that are part of the cytoskeleton and are necessary for cells to have diverse, complex shapes and migratory ability. They are made by the centrosome, which contains a pair of cylindrical centrioles at right-angles to each other. Before division, CENPF localises at the end of one of the centrioles (the mother centriole) in order to orient microtubules correctly to form thin cellular projections called cilia. Most cilia are primary cilia, which are involved in cell signalling to trigger migration, division or differentiation. Mutations in CENPF disrupt this ability to form cilia; cilia have been found to be fewer in number and shorter when the gene is mutated.

CENPF is thought to form either a homodimer or heterodimer.

Clinical significance 
Mutations in both copies of CENPF cause Strømme syndrome, characterised by microcephaly, eye abnormalities and apple-peel jejunal atresia. Autoantibodies against CENPF have been found in patients with cancer or graft-versus-host disease.

See also 

 CENPE
CENPJ
 CENPT

References

External links

Further reading